Acarolella obnixa is a species of moth of the family Tortricidae. It is found in Brazil (Parana).

References

Moths described in 1983
Cochylini
Moths of South America
Taxa named by Józef Razowski